John Jackson Howard is a physician, professor, and public health administrator. He served a 6-year term as the director of the National Institute for Occupational Safety and Health and was appointed to be a special coordinator to respond to the health effects of the September 11 attacks. In this role, Howard advocated for rescue workers, introducing a program to provide screening, medical exams, and treatment for them. In 2009, Howard was again appointed as director of NIOSH and as World Trade Center Programs coordinator for HHS.
In 2011, Howard became the Administrator of the World Trade Center Health Program. In 2016, he became the first person to be appointed to a third 6-year term as NIOSH director, and was reappointed to a fourth term in 2021.

Early career

Education
John Howard received a doctor of medicine degree from Loyola University in 1974 (cum laude). To this he added a Master of Public Health from the Harvard School of Public Health in 1982. In 1986, Dr. Howard earned a Juris Doctor from the University of California, Los Angeles (UCLA), and a Master of Laws in Administrative Law and Economic Regulation from The George Washington University in 1987. He also received a Master of Business Administration in Healthcare Management, from George Washington University, in 2016. In addition, Dr. Howard is a board-certified occupational physician and has written numerous papers on occupational health law and policy.

Physician and professor
Dr. Howard began his career in occupational health in 1979 as an internist at the UCLA School of Medicine pulmonary fellowship program at Cedars-Sinai Medical Center. His clinical work involved asbestos-exposed shipyard workers, and he published research findings related to workplace exposure and occupational lung disease. He served as a medical director and chief clinician at the Philip Mandelker AIDS Prevention Clinic.

He also worked as an assistant professor of environmental and occupational medicine at the University of California, Irvine.

Department of Industrial Relations, California
John Howard served as the chief of the Division of Occupational Safety and Health in California's Department of Industrial Relations from 1991 to 2002. There he administered a staff of nearly 1,000 and all the state's occupational and public safety programs. Through his administration of the division, Howard bolstered his reputation in the field as a passionate and able leader.  He received praise for successfully implementing a controversial statewide ergonomic standard.  He served in this capacity for more than a decade.

National Institute for Occupational Safety and Health

Appointment
Linda Rosenstock resigned in November 2000 as the director of the National Institute for Occupational Safety and Health. The position was not filled until July 15, 2002, when Tommy Thompson, Health and Human Services Secretary placed John Howard in the post. The gap between Rosenstock and Howard was the longest between directors in the agency's 31-year history. The appointment was immediately praised by several organizations including the American Industrial Hygiene Association and AFL-CIO.

A shift in focus
Under Dr. Howard, NIOSH shifted its research efforts to focus on emerging technologies. Howard sought practical applications for the new research. This included an initiative called "research-to-practice" (r2p) to ensure that NIOSH's findings would turn into practices and products that would ultimately benefit workers.   He directed research on mining, nanotechnology, job stress, and ergonomics. Howard summarized the adjustments the Institute needed to make:

Howard expanded the National Occupational Research Agenda (NORA) instituted by his predecessor, Dr. Rosenstock, using it as a vehicle to work toward the institute's updated aims.

World Trade Center responders
John Howard was appointed by President George W. Bush to be a special coordinator to handle the medical issues afflicting 9/11 rescue workers, specifically those at the World Trade Center site. Howard introduced the World Trade Center (WTC) Medical Monitoring and Treatment Program, which offered medical help and screening to emergency workers. With the enactment of the James Zadroga 9/11 Health and Compensation Act, Howard in 2011 became Administrator of the World Trade Center Health Program.

Approach
As a public health administrator, Howard was admired for his ability to collaborate effectively, even with adversarial parties. He was noted for the tone of "openness and cooperation" he set and for listening to and seeking input from all available stakeholders.

Removal from NIOSH
As Dr. Howard's 6-year term approached its close, Centers for Disease Control and Prevention (CDC) director Julie Gerberding met with him to inform him that he would not be reappointed. His term ended on July 14, 2008, in a "controversial decision that brought criticism from safety and health stakeholders". He completed his term and began serving as a temporary senior advisor to the CDC director. NIOSH associate director Christine Branche, Ph.D., served as acting director in Dr. Howard's place.

Reappointment at NIOSH
On September 3, 2009, HHS Secretary Kathleen Sebelius announced Howard's reappointment as director of NIOSH and World Trade Center Programs coordinator for HHS. In 2016, Howard became the first person to be appointed to a third 6-year term as NIOSH director.

References

External links
National Institute for Occupational Safety and Health

George Washington University Law School alumni
Harvard School of Public Health alumni
Living people
Loyola Marymount University alumni
National Institute for Occupational Safety and Health
American public health doctors
Place of birth missing (living people)
University of California, Irvine faculty
UCLA School of Law alumni
Year of birth missing (living people)